The Tobin Bronze Stakes, registered as the Euclase Stakes is a South Australian Jockey Club Group 2 Thoroughbred horse race for three-year-olds, at set weights, over a distance of 1200 metres, held at Morphettville Racecourse in Adelaide, Australia during the SAJC Autumn Carnival.  Total prize money for the race is A$202,250.

History
The registered race name is named after Euclase, who won this race in 1991 and later went on to win the SAJC Goodwood Handicap the following year.

Grade
1981–1985 was a Listed Race
1986–1990 was a Group 3
1991 onwards Group 2

Name
1981–1987 - Great Western Plate
1988–1989 - Carrington Blush Plate
1990–2000 - Angus Brut Classic
2001–2011 - Yallambee Classic
2012–2013 - Centrebet Classic
2014 - Sportingbet Classic
2015 - William Hill Stakes
2016 - Ubet Stakes
2017–2020 - Euclase Stakes
2021 onwards - Tobin Bronze Stakes

Winners

 2022 - Seradess
 2021 - Beau Rossa
 2020 - Xilong
 2019 - Valour Road
 2018 - I'll Have A Bit
 2017 - Sweet Sherry
 2016 - Faatinah
 2015 - Nicoscene
 2014 - Miracles Of Life
 2013 - Lonhspresso
 2012 - Go The Knuckle
 2011 - Shrapnel
 2010 - Majestic Music
 2009 - Champagne Harmony
 2008 - Diplomatic Force
 2007 - Universal Queen
 2006 - Magically
 2005 - Honalee
 2004 - Danabaa
 2003 - Toast Of The Coast
 2002 - Troubles
 2001 - Ateates
 2000 - Honour The Name
 1999 - Close Your Eyes
 1998 - Show No Emotion
 1997 - Blazing Reality
 1996 - Masked Party
 1995 - Sword
 1994 - Elegancy
 1993 - Never Undercharge
 1992 - Dapper's Hope
 1991 - Euclase
 1990 - Rechabite
 1989 - Vitalic
 1988 - Change Of Habit
 1987 - Northern Copy
 1986 - Sica Fortune
 1985 - Rich Fields Lad
 1984 - Mighty Avenger
 1983 - Mighty Manitou
 1982 - Warrior King
 1981 - Apollo's Flame

See also
 List of Australian Group races
 Group races

References

Horse races in Australia
Sport in Adelaide